Zeipora is a village located in Devsar tehsil of Kulgam district in Jammu and Kashmir, India.

Demographics 
According to Census 2011 information, the location code or village code of Zeipora Devsar village is 004055.

Shrine 
In this village there is a shrine namely Haji baba  and a sign tree of Hazrat simnania and an active foundation which is run by some youth in the village namely Simnania youth foundation affiliated with Tehreek-e-Soutul Awliya.

References 

Villages in Kulgam district